Lucigenin is an aromatic compound used in areas which include chemiluminescence. Its chemical name is bis-N-methylacridinium nitrate.  It exhibits a bluish-green fluorescence.

It is used as a probe for superoxide anion in biology, for its chemiluminescent properties.

Synthesis

It may be prepared from acridone. 

There's also a route from toluene:

Nitrates
Acridines
Quaternary ammonium compounds